The 2019–20 VfB Stuttgart season was the 127th season in the football club's history and their third overall season in the second division of German football, the 2. Bundesliga, having been relegated from the Bundesliga in the previous season. In addition to the 2. Bundesliga, VfB Stuttgart also participated in the DFB-Pokal. This was the 87th season for Stuttgart in the Mercedes-Benz Arena, located in Stuttgart, Baden-Württemberg, Germany.

Season summary
In May 2019, Stuttgart appointed Tim Walter as their new head coach. Despite a strong start to the season, with Stuttgart third at Christmas, Walter was sacked on 23 December 2019, with Stuttgart appointing Pellegrino Matarazzo as his replacement on 30 December 2019. However, in March 2020, the season was postponed due to the coronavirus pandemic, putting Stuttgart's promotion hopes in doubt.

Transfers

Transfers in

Loans in

Transfers out

Loans out

Competitions

2. Bundesliga

League table

Results summary

Results by matchday

Matches

DFB-Pokal

Player statistics

Appearances and goals

|-
! colspan=14 style=background:#dcdcdc; text-align:center| Goalkeepers

|-
! colspan=14 style=background:#dcdcdc; text-align:center| Defenders

|-
! colspan=14 style=background:#dcdcdc; text-align:center| Midfielders

|-
! colspan=14 style=background:#dcdcdc; text-align:center| Forwards

|-
! colspan=14 style=background:#dcdcdc; text-align:center| Players transferred out during the season

Notes

References

VfB Stuttgart seasons
Stuttgart